is a 1968 Japanese pink film directed by the "Father of Pink", Tetsuji Takechi, and starring the current "Queen" of Pink, Noriko Tatsumi. Made after Takechi had won an obscenity trial over Black Snow (1965), the film has been called "Takechi's personal message to Eirin." Though still containing significant erotic content, this is one of Takechi's few films to pass the censor relatively un-edited, perhaps because Eirin feared losing another embarrassing public confrontation with the outspoken director. In October 2006 Ukiyo-e Cruel Story was shown as part of a Takechi retrospective, and it was released on DVD in Japan on January 25, 2008.

Notes

Sources
 
 
 
 
 
 

1968 films
Daiei Film films
1960s exploitation films
Films directed by Tetsuji Takechi
Japanese erotic films
Pink films
1960s pornographic films
1960s erotic films
1960s Japanese films